Salvador Márquez Lozornio (born 24 December 1956) is a Mexican politician affiliated with the National Action Party. He served as Deputy of the LIX Legislature of the Mexican Congress representing Guanajuato, and previously served in the LVIII Legislature of the Congress of Guanajuato.

References

1956 births
Living people
Politicians from Guanajuato
People from Celaya
National Action Party (Mexico) politicians
Members of the Congress of Guanajuato
Deputies of the LIX Legislature of Mexico
Members of the Chamber of Deputies (Mexico) for Guanajuato